The White River spinedace (Lepidomeda albivallis) is a critically endangered cyprinid fish of Nevada, occurring only in the White River in the southeastern part of the state.

This spindace ranges from green to olive above, a brassy silver on the sides, becoming a silvery white underneath. The sides may also have a pattern of faint sooty patches. Dorsal and caudal fins are shades of brown, ranging from olive brown to a pinkish brown; the rays tend to be olive with the membranes between being transparent with a rosy cast. Pectoral fins are yellowish, while the pelvic and anal fins have white rays with red-orange membranes. The dorsal fin has seven rays, the anal fin has eight rays, and the pelvic fins usually seven. Size ranges up to 15 cm.

The range is limited to a single cool spring and its overflow area in the upper pluvial White River.

See Also 
 Fauna of Nevada

References

  Listed as Critically Endangered (CR A1bce v2.3)
 
 William F. Sigler and John W. Sigler, Fishes of the Great Basin (Reno: University of Nevada Press, 1987), pp. 185–186
 

Lepidomeda
Fish of the Western United States
Fauna of the Great Basin
Fish described in 1960
ESA endangered species